Nick Evangelista (born 1949) is a fencing master, author, and magazine publisher. He teaches the classical French school of fencing in Springfield, Missouri. He also teaches the Missouri State University Fencing Society. He was trained by Olympic fencer Ralph Faulkner. He is also the publisher of Fencers Quarterly Magazine.

Works
One of the more prolific and outspoken proponents of classical fencing, Evangelista has authored several books, including:
The Encyclopedia of the Sword (1995); 
The Art and Science of Fencing (1996); 
Fighting with Sticks (1998) 
The Inner Game of Fencing (2000);

See also
Swordsmanship

References

American male fencers
Living people
1949 births
Historians of weapons